The seventh series of the British children's television series The Dumping Ground began broadcasting on 4 January 2019 on CBBC and ended on 6 December 2019. The series follows the lives of the children living in the fictional children's care home of Ashdene Ridge, nicknamed by them "The Dumping Ground". It consisted of twenty-four, thirty-minute episodes; from episode two onwards, episodes premiered a week early on BBC iPlayer. It is the 15th series in The Story of Tracy Beaker franchise.

Cast

Main

Guest

Episodes
Air dates refer to the episodes' initial airing (i.e. from episodes 2-12, their premiere on BBC iPlayer, which took place a week in advance of their TV broadcast). Ratings are four-screen figures which include pre-transmission viewing.

Production and casting
A seventh series of The Dumping Ground was confirmed in 2016 and production began in April 2017. Like the previous five series, the front exterior is filmed at Rowlands Gill, Tyne and Wear whilst an old school in Newcastle upon Tyne and buildings of the former Loansdean fire station in Morpeth, Northumberland are also used for interior and exterior sets. Additional filming takes place across the North East, including locations such as Newcastle University. All the main cast from the last episode of the sixth series reprise their roles apart from Yousef Naseer who plays Joseph Stubbs. Hylton's sister, Tink, will be standing in for Hylton and Connor Byrne will also be playing the role of Peadar for an episode. Ava Potter and Anya Cooke joined as Bec Hyde and Katy respectively.

Directors for series 7 include: David Beauchamp (4 episodes), Gary Williams, Tracey Larcombe (4 episodes), Steve Brett, Nicole Volavka, Alex Jacob (2 episodes), Hidegard Ryan (1 episode) and Amanda Mealing; the last of these, who portrays Connie Beauchamp in Casualty, is set to direct the 22nd episode of the series, titled "Reunion".

The series' writers include Keith Brumpton (writing an episode entitled "2+2=5"), new writer David Chikwe, Suzanne Cowie (writing the fourth episode, which is set at a horse-riding school), Julie Dixon, Dawn Harrison, John Hickman (2 episodes), Kayleigh Llewellyn, Owen Lloyd-Fox (writing the twenty-second episode, "Reunion"), Kim Millar, new writer Claire Miller, Jeff Povey, Christine Roberson, Gareth Sargent, Rachel Smith, Mark Stevenson and Joe Williams.

References

2019 British television seasons
The Dumping Ground